Talk of a Million (also known as You Can't Beat the Irish) is a 1951 British comedy film directed by John Paddy Carstairs, starring Jack Warner, with an early appearance from Sid James.

Premise
Shakespeare-loving Bartley Murnahan, (Jack Warner), is a likeable, work-shy idler, who allows creditors and others to believe that he's due a half-a-million pounds inheritance. 
Using only his wits and the new estimation in which his creditors and others then form of him, their sudden good-will and business co-operation allow him to write-off his debts, establish his impoverished family in business, and to marry his daughter to the son of a local landowner, whose Father had formerly scorned her. How long shall it take before everyone sees through his blarney?

Cast
Jack Warner as Bartley Murnahan 
Barbara Mullen as Bessie Murnahan 
Joan Kenny as Sally Murnahan 
Elizabeth Erskine as Norah Murnahan 
Ronan O'Casey as Derry Murnahan 
Vincent Ball as Jack Murnahan 
Noel Purcell as Matty McGrath 
Paul Connell as Joe McGrath
Michael Dolan as Tubridy
Niall MacGinnis as Tom Cassidy 
Alfie Bass as Lorcan 
Sid James as John C. Moody  
Anita Sharp-Bolster as Miss Rafferty
Tony Quinn	as Sacristan
John McDarby as Porter
Milo O'Shea as Signwriter
Michael Trubshawe as church groundsman - (uncredited)

Critical reception
The New York Times noted "a pleasantly garrulous little item that turned up at the Park Avenue yesterday...The plot, it might be noted, is closer to contrivance than ingenuity but the performances are uniformly fine. Jack Warner is excellent as the cultured but lazy father, who is anxious to help his brood and just as ready to quote the Bard at a moment's notice. Barbara Mullen does equally well in the role of his persevering wife. Acting honors, however, go to Michael Dolan, an Abbey Theatre veteran, as the designing village grocer, whose schemes to bilk our hero backfire. Only Barry Fitzgerald could approximate his characterization and it would take a poteen-filled denizen of a Dublin shebeen to equal his brogue and delivery. Add too, the explosive performance of Noel Purcell as an irascible farmer." TV Guide gave the film two out of five stars, calling it "Pleasantly whimsical, as expected from the title (You Can't Beat the Irish)."

References

External links 
 

1951 films
British comedy films
Films directed by John Paddy Carstairs
1951 comedy films
British black-and-white films
1950s English-language films
1950s British films